The Potato yellow vein virus (PYVV) is a plant pathogen of the Closteroviridae family. It is a whitefly-transmitted closterovirus vectored by Trialeurodes vaporariorum, which is known to cause a yellowing disease in potato crops in South America.
PYVV RNA have a conserved 3'-terminal secondary structure, which includes a pseudoknot.

References

Closteroviridae
Viral plant pathogens and diseases